Harry Thomson Jones (1925 – 5 December 2007), often known as "Tom Jones", was a British racehorse trainer whose career lasted from 1951 to 1996. He was successful in National Hunt racing, training the winners of 12 Cheltenham Festival races before switching to flat racing and going on to train the winners of British Classic Races.

He was educated at Eton College and was first licensed as a trainer in 1951. Amongst his notable National Hunt horses were Tingle Creek, winner of 11 races and a specialist at Sandown Park Racecourse, and Frenchman's Cove, winner of the 1962 Whitbread Gold Cup and 1964 King George VI Chase.

By the 1970s he had begun to concentrate on flat racing and trained his first Classic winner when Athens Wood won the 1971 St. Leger. In 1982 he trained Touching Wood to win the St. Leger and Irish St. Leger for Maktoum al Maktoum, the first Classic winner owned by the Maktoum family. Sheikh Hamdan al Maktoum became his principal owner and the most successful horse he trained for Sheikh Hamdan was Al Bahathri, winner of the Lowther Stakes in 1984 and the Irish 1,000 Guineas, Coronation Stakes and Child Stakes in 1985.

His last winner came when Agdistis won at Worcester Racecourse on 12 October 1996 and he retired later that year.

He was married twice and had three children. With his first wife Solna Joel, he had a son, Tim Thomson Jones, and daughter, Di Haine, who are also racehorse trainers; with his second wife Sarah Beatty, he had another son, Christopher Thomson Jones, who lives in South Carolina.

References

1925 births
2007 deaths
British racehorse trainers
People educated at Eton College